Sergio Busquets Burgos (born 16 July 1988) is a Spanish professional footballer who plays as a defensive midfielder for La Liga club Barcelona, where he is captain. He is considered to be a deep-lying playmaker capable of directing gameplay — through short and calm passes, exceptional positioning, and his singular reading of the game — and is widely regarded as one of the best defensive midfielders of all time.

A one-club man, he arrived in Barcelona's first team in July 2008. Since then he has made over 600 total appearances for the club and has won 30 trophies, including 8 La Liga titles, 7 Copa del Rey titles and 3 UEFA Champions Leagues. He was part of their squads that won a continental treble of La Liga, Copa del Rey and the UEFA Champions League in 2008–09 and 2014–15.

Busquets made his senior international debut for Spain in April 2009, and has since made 143 appearances for the national side. He helped the country win the 2010 World Cup and Euro 2012 tournaments, and also featured at three other World Cups and two European Championships.

Club career
Born in Sabadell, Barcelona, Catalonia, Busquets began playing football with local team CD Badia del Vallès, followed by spells with CEF Barberà Andalucía, Lleida and UFB Jàbac Terrassa, before joining Barcelona's youth ranks in 2005. He scored seven goals in 26 games for the Juvenil A team in his second season and, two years later, Busquets was promoted to the B team under Pep Guardiola, and helped them achieve promotion to the third division. In that same season he would make his first-team debut, coming on as a substitute in the Copa Catalunya.

Busquets played his first La Liga match on 13 September 2008, featuring 90 minutes in a 1–1 home draw to Racing Santander. During Barcelona's 2008–09 UEFA Champions League clash against Basel at St. Jakob-Park on 22 October 2008, he scored the second goal in the 15th minute in a 5–0 group stage win; in early December, in another start, he scored his second with Barça in the competition, netting in the 83rd minute of a 2–3 home loss against Shakhtar Donetsk.

On 22 December 2008, Busquets signed a contract extension until 2013 with a buy-out clause of €80 million. On 7 March 2009 he scored his first league goal, in a 2–0 home win over Athletic Bilbao. On 27 May 2009, having been regularly played as he competed for the spot with internationals Seydou Keita and Yaya Touré, he also featured in Barcelona's starting eleven in the Champions League final, a 2–0 win over Manchester United in Rome; with that victory, Carles Busquets and Sergio Busquets became only the third father-and-son combo to both have won Europe's top club competition playing for the same team, joining Cesare Maldini and Paolo Maldini (won it with A.C. Milan) and Manuel Sanchís and Manolo Sanchís (Real Madrid).

Busquets' fine form continued in the 2009–10 campaign, with Guardiola preferring him to Touré as Barcelona's central holding midfielder. In the second leg of the Champions League semi-final 1–0 victory (and an eventual 2–3 aggregate defeat) against Inter Milan at Camp Nou on 28 April 2010, he went down to the ground after Thiago Motta had raised his arm and appeared to push Busquets directly in the face. As a result of this action, the former was shown a red card and dismissed for violent conduct, whilst the latter was subsequently criticised by both Motta and the media for apparently feigning injury.

Busquets was again ever-present in 2010–11, even playing as a centre back on occasions. On 27 January 2011, he signed a contract extension that would keep him at the club until 2015 – the buyout clause was increased to €150 million. On 8 March 2011, playing at centre back, he scored an own goal from a corner kick against Arsenal, in the season's Champions League round-of-16, levelling the score at 1–1; Barcelona eventually won the game 3–1 (and 4–3 on aggregate). On 28 May, Busquets played the full match during his side's 3–1 Champions league final victory against Manchester United at Wembley Stadium.

Busquets scored a rare goal on 24 April 2012 – only his sixth official one in four years – netting from an easy tap-in after an Isaac Cuenca cross to make it 1–0 for the hosts in the second leg of the Champions League semi-finals against Chelsea. Barcelona could only draw 2–2 against ten men as the English club came back from being 0–2 down; his team eventually lost 2–3 on aggregate, after already having lost 1–0 in the first leg at Stamford Bridge.

On 16 July 2013, the day he celebrated his 25th birthday, Busquets agreed to a new deal until 2018, with the buyout clause remaining unaltered. On 1 August 2014, after the retirement of long time club captain and defender Carles Puyol and at the veteran's personal request, he was given the number 5 shirt for the upcoming campaign and was named one of the four captains for the club alongside Xavi, Andrés Iniesta and Lionel Messi.

Busquets started on 6 June in the 2015 Champions League final, as the team won their fifth accolade in the competition by beating Juventus 3–1 at Berlin's Olympiastadion. This made Barcelona the first club in history to win the treble of domestic league, domestic cup and European Cup twice, and Dani Alves, Busquets, Andrés Iniesta, Lionel Messi, Pedro, Gerard Piqué and Xavi the only players to achieve the same feat. 

On 3 October 2015, Busquets captained Barcelona for the first time in the absence of regular captain Iniesta and vice-captain Messi in a 1–2 away defeat to Sevilla.

Busquets opened the scoring in a 3–0 win against Las Palmas on 1 October 2017, with the match being played behind closed doors at the Camp Nou due to the ongoing Catalan independence referendum. Around a year later, he signed a new contract until June 2023, which increased his buyout clause from €200 million to €500 million. On 24 November 2018 he played his 500th game for Barcelona away to Atlético Madrid, and he made his 100th Champions League appearance on 11 December, in a 1–1 group stage home draw against Tottenham Hotspur.

On 9 January 2021, Busquets made his 600th appearance for Barcelona in a 4–0 win against Granada at the Los Cármenes. Only his contemporaries Xavi, Iniesta and Messi had played more games in the history of the club. In August, he became club captain after Messi left for Paris Saint-Germain FC. On 12 January 2023, Busquets made his 700th appearance for Barcelona in his team's penalty shoot-out victory after a 2–2 draw against Real Betis at the King Fahd International Stadium in 2022–23 Supercopa de España semi-final. In the next match, three days later, Busquets participated in his team's 3–1 win against Real Madrid in the 2023 Supercopa de España Final, becoming the player with the most matches in the history of El Clásico with 45 matches, jointly with Lionel Messi and Sergio Ramos, in addition he becoming the player with the most wins in El Clásico matches, with 21 matches, jointly with Paco Gento.

International career

On 11 October 2008, Busquets earned his first cap for Spain's under-21 in their 2009 UEFA European Under-21 Football Championship qualification play-offs first-leg away match against Switzerland. He scored in the 17th minute of a 1–2 loss, though they eventually emerged victorious 4–3 on aggregate. On 28 December, he played his first game for the Catalan representative side, starting in a 2–1 win over Colombia at the Camp Nou.

On 11 February 2009, Busquets was called up to the senior squad for a friendly against England. He was named as a substitute for a 2010 FIFA World Cup qualifier against Turkey on 28 March 2009, making his debut in the return match on 1 April, playing 16 minutes in a 2–1 win in Istanbul after replacing David Silva. In the summer, he went to his first senior tournament, helping Spain come third at the 2009 FIFA Confederations Cup in South Africa.

Busquets was selected by manager Vicente del Bosque for the 2010 World Cup in the same country, assuming the holding midfielder role naturalized Brazilian Marcos Senna had previously occupied in the conquest of UEFA Euro 2008. He played all of the tournament's games and minutes for the eventual world champions, save the last 30 minutes of the 0–1 group-stage loss against Switzerland in Durban. He finished the tournament with the third–highest pass success rate, alongside his teammate Puyol, completing 88% of his passes.

At UEFA Euro 2012 in Poland and Ukraine, Busquets played every minute as Spain won the title, and he was named in the Team of the Tournament. On 8 September 2014, he scored his first international goal in a 5–1 win over Macedonia during Euro 2016's qualifying phase. His second came during the same tournament on 15 November, in the 3–0 defeat of Belarus in Huelva. He was selected for the final tournament in France.

Busquets celebrated his 100th appearance for Spain on 9 October 2017, in a 1–0 away win against Israel for the 2018 World Cup qualifiers. Subsequently, he was named in Julen Lopetegui's squad for the finals in Russia. 

On 7 October 2020, Busquets captained the Spanish for the first time in a goalless friendly draw away to Portugal, as Sergio Ramos was on the bench. The following May, he was included in Luis Enrique's 24-man squad for UEFA Euro 2020. In the absence of Ramos, he was named captain. He tested positive for COVID-19 eight days before Spain's first game, causing the entire squad to withdraw from their final warm-up match against Lithuania. He missed the first two group games – both draws – before returning to the team for the third, in which he was voted man of the match by UEFA for a 5–0 win over Slovakia. Four days later, in their round of 16 match against Croatia, Busquets was again named the man of the match in his team's 5–3 extra time victory. In the quarter-finals, he hit the post with Spain's first kick of the penalty shootout against Switzerland, though his team prevailed.

In the final against France on 10 October, he once set-up Mikel Oyarzabal who scored the opening goal of the match, although Spain ultimately suffered a 2–1 defeat. For his performances throughout the 2021 UEFA Nations League Finals, Busquets won the Hisense Player of the Finals award.

In the 2022 World Cup, Busquets captained the national team during the tournament in Qatar. In the round of 16, he missed a penalty during the penalty shootouts against Morocco, which ended in a 3–0 defeat after a goalless draw.
On 16 December 2022, Sergio announced his retirement from international football, having made 143 appearances in a 15-year period.

Style of play

Considered by several pundits to be one of the best midfielders of his generation, and one of the greatest holding midfielders of all time. Busquets is usually deployed as either a central or defensive midfielder, although he is also capable of playing as a central defender. A hard-working player, he excels at intercepting loose balls and breaking down opposition plays due to his positional sense, defensive attributes, tackling, tactical intelligence, and ability to read the game, despite his lack of pace. Due to his vision, ball control, physical prowess, technical skills, calm composure on the ball, and accurate passing ability, he rarely relinquishes possession, and alongside his former midfield teammates, such as Iniesta, Xavi and Ivan Rakitić, he has also played an important creative role in setting his team's tempo in midfield as a deep-lying playmaker through his short passing game. His role has also been likened to that of a metodista ("centre-half," in Italian football jargon), due to his ability to dictate play in midfield as well as assist his team defensively. His position and playing style have led him to be compared to his former manager, as well as fellow former Spain and Barcelona player, Pep Guardiola.

Manager del Bosque praised Busquets, saying, "If you watch the whole game, you won't see Busquets—but watch Busquets, and you will see the whole game." The latter's height also allows him to be effective in the air, and enables him to advance into more offensive positions on occasion, providing an additional attacking outlet for his team.
Busquets has been accused of play-acting in the past, due to his tendency of exaggerating fouls. However, in response to these criticisms, he defended his behavior as intelligent, arguing that the realities of the game are more complex.

Often considered to be one of the most underrated footballers in the world, Busquets earned praise from his peers, with former club teammate Messi saying "When there will be trouble, Busquets will always be there."

Personal life
Busquets' father, Carles, was also a footballer. He played as a goalkeeper for Barcelona for several years during the 1990s, although almost exclusively as a backup.

In 2014, Busquets started a relationship with Elena Galera. They have two sons born in 2016 and 2018. He sported an Arabic tattoo on his left forearm translating to "A thing for you, the life in my country", dedicated to his maternal grandfather to whom he was very close.

Career statistics

Club

Notes

International

Scores and results list Spain's goal tally first, score column indicates score after each Busquets goal.

Honours
Barcelona
La Liga: 2008–09, 2009–10, 2010–11, 2012–13, 2014–15, 2015–16, 2017–18, 2018–19
Copa del Rey: 2008–09, 2011–12, 2014–15, 2015–16, 2016–17, 2017–18, 2020–21
Supercopa de España: 2009, 2010, 2011, 2013, 2016, 2018, 2022–23
UEFA Champions League: 2008–09, 2010–11, 2014–15
UEFA Super Cup: 2009, 2011, 2015
FIFA Club World Cup: 2009, 2011, 2015

Spain
FIFA World Cup: 2010
UEFA European Championship: 2012
FIFA Confederations Cup runner-up: 2013; third place 2009
UEFA Nations League runner-up: 2020–21

Individual
Bravo Award: 2009
La Liga's Breakthrough Player: 2009
FIFA World Cup All-Star Team: 2010
UEFA European Championship Team of the Tournament: 2012
UEFA Champions League Squad of the Season: 2014–15
La Liga Team of the Season: 2015–16
UEFA La Liga Team of the Season: 2015–16
UEFA Nations League Finals Player of the Tournament: 2021
Decorations
Prince of Asturias Awards: 2010
Gold Medal of the Royal Order of Sporting Merit: 2011

See also 
 List of footballers with 100 or more UEFA Champions League appearances
 List of men's footballers with 100 or more international caps
 List of FC Barcelona players (100+ appearances)
 List of La Liga players (400+ appearances)
 List of one-club men in association football

Notes

References

External links

Profile at the FC Barcelona website

1988 births
Living people
Sportspeople from Sabadell
Spanish footballers
Footballers from Catalonia
Association football midfielders
FC Barcelona Atlètic players
FC Barcelona players
Tercera División players
Segunda División B players
La Liga players
UEFA Champions League winning players
Spain under-21 international footballers
Spain international footballers
Catalonia international footballers
2009 FIFA Confederations Cup players
2010 FIFA World Cup players
UEFA Euro 2012 players
2013 FIFA Confederations Cup players
2014 FIFA World Cup players
UEFA Euro 2016 players
2018 FIFA World Cup players
UEFA Euro 2020 players
2022 FIFA World Cup players
FIFA World Cup-winning players
UEFA European Championship-winning players
FIFA Century Club